Christopher Andrew Koster (born August 31, 1964) is an American lawyer and politician who served as the 41st Attorney General of Missouri from 2009 to 2017. Before that, Koster was elected three times as prosecuting attorney of Cass County, Missouri, and served four years as State Senator from Missouri's 31st Senatorial district.

In 2016, Koster was the Democratic nominee for Governor of Missouri and was defeated by Republican nominee Eric Greitens in the general election. After completing his terms as Attorney General, Koster joined Centene Corporation, where he currently serves as Executive Vice President, Secretary, and General Counsel.

Personal life

Early life and education 
Koster was born in St. Louis, Missouri. Koster earned a liberal arts bachelor's degree from the University of Missouri - Columbia in 1987 and his Juris Doctor from the University of Missouri - Columbia School of Law in 1991. Koster also earned a master's degree in Business Administration from Washington University in St. Louis in 2002.

Early career 
From 1991 to 1993, Koster served as an Assistant Attorney General for the Office of the Missouri Attorney General. From 1993 to 1994, he practiced law with the firm of Blackwell Sanders in Kansas City, Missouri.

Political career

Cass County (MO) Prosecuting Attorney 
In 1994, Koster was elected Prosecuting Attorney for Cass County, Missouri, as a Republican and was re-elected in 1998 and 2002 by wide margins.

Koster supervised the Missouri investigation and prosecution of serial killer John Edward Robinson. On June 4, 2000, Koster led a group of law enforcement officers in the discovery of the remains of three female victims of Robinson's, each stored in 55-gallon drums inside a Raymore, Missouri storage facility. In conjunction with prosecutors in Kansas, John Robinson was convicted of the murders of eight women in two states, although more victims are believed to have been killed by Robinson. Robinson lured his victims over the internet, and has been called the internet's first serial killer.

Missouri Senate 

Koster was elected to the Missouri Senate in 2004 as a Republican. He represented Missouri's 31st Senatorial District, which consists of Cass, Johnson, Bates and Vernon counties. During his time in the Missouri Senate, Koster played key roles in the debates over stem cell research, tort reform, and the elimination of Medicaid fraud. In 2006, he carried legislation in the Senate that overhauled Missouri's eminent domain laws.

On August 1, 2007, Koster made Missouri political history when he announced that he was leaving the Missouri Republican Party to join the Democratic party. Citing his frustration with the Republican Party's increasing intolerance on issues like stem cell research, workers' rights, cultural inclusion, and the non-partisan court plan, Koster said that the Missouri Republican Party had become too beholden to the extreme right-wing of the party. He said, "Today, Republican moderates are all but extinct."

Before his change of parties, Koster was chairman of the Republican Caucus, the majority party's fourth-ranking position in the Missouri State Senate.

While in the Senate, he served on the following Senate committees:

Economic Development, Tourism, and Local Government
Judiciary and Civil and Criminal Jurisprudence
Pensions, Veterans' Affairs and General Laws
Commerce, Energy and the Environment
Agriculture, Conservation, Parks and Natural Resources

Attorney General

2008 election 

In 2008, Koster defeated State Representative Margaret Donnelly and Jeff Harris in the Democratic primary for the nomination for Missouri Attorney General. Despite joining the Missouri Democratic party only a year earlier, and primary rivals calling him an opportunist for switching parties, Koster received several Democratic-leaning endorsements from law enforcement, labor unions, Democratic interest groups and elected officials. Koster won the nomination despite accusations from Donnelly and Harris that his campaign violated state law in raising money from multiple committees.

During the campaign, Koster's ex-wife Rebecca Bowman Nassikas donated $200,000 to Missourians for Honest Leadership, a political committee, which paid $187,500 to purchase air time and produce television ads in an effort to oppose Koster's candidacy for Missouri Attorney General. He went on to defeat Republican State Senator Mike Gibbons in the general election, 52.83% to 47.17%. He was sworn in as attorney general on January 12, 2009, succeeding Jay Nixon.

First term, 2009–2013 
In 2011, Koster filed an amicus brief opposing the individual mandate in the Affordable Care Act under the Commerce Clause. He filed a second amicus brief suggesting that the individual mandate could be upheld under Congress' ability to lay and collect taxes, which is how the Supreme Court ruled on the matter in 2012.

In 2012, Koster's staff moved to the Broadway Building in Jefferson City. After this move, a request was made for "repairs, replacements and improvements" on two floors. However, Koster's office was in the Supreme Court Building. Funding for the $3.2 million request came from money recovered from consumer fraud cases. Also in 2012, a report by state auditor Tom Schweich criticized Koster for his practice of awarding contingency fee contracts to law firms that had donated to his campaign.

Second term, 2013–2017 
Koster is an advocate of the death penalty. In July 2013, there were 21 inmates on death row in Missouri whose executions he was pressing the Supreme Court of Missouri to set a date for before the drugs used for lethal injections expired. After the 21 inmates filed suit against the Missouri Department of Corrections over the use of the drug propofol for lethal injections, concerning cruel and unusual punishment, the state Supreme Court temporarily halted the further use of the death penalty until the case was decided. Missouri law allows for the use of lethal gas where lethal injection is not available. While the propofol case was before the Missouri Supreme Court, Koster argued for the use of gas chambers to execute Missouri prisoners.

During his second term, Koster's office defended U.S. District Judge Catherine D. Perry after she denied a motion for temporary restraining orders on six police officers enforcing a "5-second rule" that required demonstrators to move every five seconds or face arrest in Ferguson, Missouri, citing the need for law enforcement's protection of property and the availability of a designated protest area. However, at the time of this ruling, the designated protest area was off-limits to the public. This "5-second rule" was later determined to be unconstitutional by a different federal judge.

In February 2014, Koster filed a suit on behalf of six states challenging California's prohibition on the sale of eggs laid by caged hens kept in conditions more restrictive than those approved by California voters in a 2008 ballot initiative, Proposition 2. In October 2014, Judge Kimberly Mueller dismissed the suit, ruling that the states lacked legal standing to sue on behalf of their residents and that Koster and other plaintiffs were representing only the interests of egg farmers, rather than "a substantial statement of their populations".

Also in October 2014, House Speaker Tim Jones announced plans to investigate charges that Koster took actions in office that were designed to benefit campaign contributors. Some of the actions investigated included: the Simmons Firm donating $100,000 to Koster's campaign in 2012 and both parties suing Republic Services in 2013; Koster ending an inquiry focusing on 5-hour Energy after conversations with a lobbyist for the company who was also a Koster contributor; Koster had negotiating an agreement with Pfizer, another campaign contributor, to pay Missouri $750,000 in connection with a multi-state investigation of illegal marketing practices, about $350,000 less than what the state would have collected had it participated in a joint negotiation with other states.

In Missouri, it is legal for elected officials to accept unlimited campaign contributions and gifts from lobbyists. Despite his position on lobbying reform, Koster rejects the idea of placing limits on the amount of money a corporation or a rich personl could contribute to a campaign. He instead suggests adding more transparency to the existing system. In December 2014, Koster said that he would no longer accept gifts from lobbyists.

During his second term as attorney general, Koster said that he supports same-sex marriage, but defended his state's former constitutional ban on it because voters approved it.

2016 gubernatorial election

In February 2016, Koster filed to run for governor of Missouri. He won the August 2 Democratic primary, but lost the general election to Republican Eric Greitens.

2017–present 
In February 2017, Koster was named Senior Vice President of Corporate Services at Centene Corp. In February 2020, Koster took the position of EVP, Secretary and General Counsel at Centene.

Electoral history

2016 Gubernatorial race

As Attorney General

As state senator

References

Sources
Official Manual, State of Missouri, 2005-2006. Jefferson City, MO: Secretary of State.

External links
Gubernatorial campaign website
Missouri Office of the Attorney General official website 
Missouri State Legislature - Senator Chris Koster official government website
Biography Sponsored Bills Co-Sponsored Bills
Project Vote Smart - Senator Chris Koster (MO) profile
Follow the Money - Chris Koster
2008 campaign contributions for Attorney General
2006 2004 campaign contributions for State Senate

|-

1964 births
21st-century American politicians
Lawyers from St. Louis
Living people
Missouri Attorneys General
Missouri Democrats
Missouri Republicans
Missouri lawyers
Missouri state senators
People from Cass County, Missouri
Politicians from St. Louis
University of Missouri alumni
Olin Business School (Washington University) alumni
Candidates in the 2016 United States elections